This is a list of electricity-generating power stations in Florida, sorted by type and name. In 2020, Florida had a total summer capacity of 61,833 MW through all of its power plants, and a net generation of 250,828 GWh.

Florida is the third largest generator of electricity in the nation behind Texas and Pennsylvania. Major producers include Florida Power & Light, Duke Energy, JEA, and TECO Energy.

In 2020, the average price of electricity in Florida was 10.06 cents per kWh, ranking 21st-highest in the United States. The carbon dioxide produced was 848 lbs per MWh, ranking 24th in the United States. The average price of electricity for residential use was 13.70 cents/kWh in February 2022, compared to 11.92 cents/kWh in February 2021.

By energy source

Photovoltaic (PV)
Total estimated capacity: 2046.45 MW

Total estimated area used: 15,569 acres

Total estimated number of panels in use: 11,078,724 panels

Small-Scale PV Installations (<5MW)

Integrated solar combined cycle (ISCC)

Hydroelectric

Natural gas 
Total estimated capacity: 36,359 MW

Nuclear 
Total estimated capacity: 3626 MW

Petroleum 
Total estimated capacity: 3355 MW

Coal 
Total estimated capacity: 7472 MW

Decommissioned stations and units

All stations

See also

List of power stations in the United States

Notes

External links
Interactive map of power plants  
US Energy Information Administration - Florida Electric Profile   
FPL 10-Year Plan
Progress Energy Plant Brochure

 
Florida
Geographic coordinate lists
Lists of buildings and structures in Florida